Blow-me-down Bluff is a prominent rock bluff,  high, standing at the north flank of Northeast Glacier on the west side of Graham Land. It was roughly surveyed in 1936 by the British Graham Land Expedition, and by the United States Antarctic Service in 1940. It was re-surveyed in 1946 and 1948 by the Falkland Islands Dependencies Survey (FIDS), who so named it because the bluff stands in the windiest part of Northeast Glacier and many members of FIDS sledge parties have fallen in this area in high winds.

References
 

Cliffs of Graham Land
Fallières Coast